Gosport is a parliamentary constituency represented in the House of Commons of the UK Parliament since 2010 by Caroline Dinenage of the Conservative Party. The constituency is anchored by the town and borough of Gosport.

Boundaries

1974–1983: The Municipal Borough of Gosport.

1983–present: The Borough of Gosport, and the Borough of Fareham wards of Hill Head and Stubbington.

The constituency centres on Peel Common, Chalk Common and the River Alver that run north–south — its largest settlement is arguably the eastern town of Gosport.  Gosport post town comprises several distinct villages and neighbourhoods on the south coast of England in Hampshire whereas the constituency comprises the whole of Gosport Borough (including Lee-on-the-Solent and Alverstoke) and includes Stubbington and Hill Head from the neighbouring Fareham Borough.

Constituency profile
Gosport has, to date, been a Conservative safe seat, as an area with a majority of privately owned properties that has a minority of poor residents. It has two large housing estates in the south and east of Rowner, for example: according to the 2001 census, these are predominantly social housing, and contain two of the most deprived output areas in terms of income and unemployment in the United Kingdom. However, the area is not of uniform characterisation. Rowner has a central conservation area of expensive housing, and touches, immediately to the west, the Lee on Solent Golf Club, Grange Farm Museum, the West of the Alder Nature Reserve and the Wild Grounds Nature reserve. Beside its bowling green, allotments and recreation ground lies the Grade I-architecture of St Mary's Church. Unlike the generally expensive west of the borough, Rowner resembles central Gosport and Bridgemary in presenting a diverse picture, retaining scenic and generally more rural surroundings than the City of Portsmouth, with some areas of deprivation.

History
The constituency was created for the February 1974 general election. The area had previously been part of the constituency of Gosport and Fareham.

In December 2009, Gosport became the second constituency to vote in an open primary to select the Conservative PPC. All residents of the area were asked to take part via a postal vote. The result of the Gosport primary saw Caroline Dinenage publicly selected.  At the general election on 6 May 2010, Caroline Dinenage was elected with 24,300 votes, a majority of 14,413 over her nearest opponent.  Dinenage is currently Minister for Social Care. Since the turn of the century, Labour, UKIP and the Liberal Democrats have all finished in second place.

Peter Viggers (later knighted) had represented the constituency from 1974 to 2010. David Cameron instructed Sir Peter not to stand for re-election after his nationally infamous attempt to claim for a duck house during the MPs' expenses scandal.

Members of Parliament

Elections

Elections in the 2010s

Elections in the 2000s

Elections in the 1990s

Elections in the 1980s

Elections in the 1970s

See also
 Fareham
 List of parliamentary constituencies in Hampshire

Notes

References

Parliamentary constituencies in Hampshire
Constituencies of the Parliament of the United Kingdom established in 1974
Politics of Gosport